Biffen och Bananen (the Beef and the Banana) was a comic strip by Rit-Ola (Jan-Erik Garland), originally published in Folket i Bild in 1936, where it ran until 1978. The strip was also published in albums and in the Swedish comic book 91:an.

Description
The comic is about two friends, the strong Biffen (based on the heavyweight boxer Harry Dahlgren) and the intelligent Bananen (based on Rit-Ola himself). The setting was often athletic, and all characters spoke Stockholmska. After a few years the duo was accompanied by a third character, Galento, named after the boxer Tony Galento.

Rit-Ola was given rather loose directions for the comics: he was required to avoid the topics of drunkenness and rape; he was obliged to deliver the strip four to five weeks prior to the publication date; and the comic must be drawn in black, white, and red.

Three movies were made about the characters: Beef and the Banana (1951), Blondie, Biffen och Bananen (1952), and Klarar Bananen Biffen? (1957). Biffen was played by Åke Grönberg and Bananen by Åke Söderblom.

References

Swedish comic strips
1936 comics debuts
1978 comics endings
Comics characters introduced in 1936
Comic strip duos
Fictional boxers
Boxing comics
Humor comics
Fictional Swedish people
Comics set in Sweden
Swedish comics adapted into films
Male characters in comics